Dead Cool is a 2004 British comedy-drama film. It was written and directed by David Cohen.

Plot

Cast 
 Imogen Stubbs as Henny
 Steven Geller as David
 James Callis as Josh
 Anthony Calf as Mark
 Liz Smith as Liz
 Rosanna Arquette as Deirdre
 Gemma Lawrence as Sue
 Olivia Wedderburn as Em
 Aaron Johnson as George 
 Martin Cole as Jim
 Patricia England as Granny
 David Cohen as Rabbi

Reception 
Derek Elley of Variety wrote: "There's nothing wrong with "Dead Cool" that a further rewrite and slicker direction couldn't fix. London-set light relationships comedy centered on a teen boy coming to grips with his mom's new boyfriend and the memory of his late father boasts good performances but is let down by weak dialogue and an unfocused feel."
Peter Bradshaw of The Guardian gave it 2 out of 5.

References

External links 
 
 

2004 films
2004 comedy-drama films
British comedy-drama films
2000s English-language films
2000s British films